Notioplusia illustrata, the notioplusia moth, is a moth of the family Noctuidae first described by Achille Guenée in 1852. It is native to Saint Kitts, the Greater Antilles (Cuba, Jamaica, Haiti, Puerto Rico), Florida, Mexico, Panama and South America. It was introduced to Australia and South Africa.

Adults have brown forewings, each with a pale line and a red splodge. The hindwings are fawn, shading darker toward the margin.

The larvae feed on the leaves of Lantana camara.

External links
Australian Faunal Directory

Moths of Australia
Plusiinae
Lepidoptera of South Africa
Lepidoptera of the Caribbean
Moths of South America
Moths of North America
Moths of Central America
Moths described in 1852